FC Berlin may refer to:

 FC Berlin (Canada/United States), a Canadian/American soccer team
 Berliner FC Dynamo, a German football club formerly known as FC Berlin